Kharchi was one of the seats in Rajasthan Legislative Assembly in India. It used to be a segment of Pali Lok Sabha seat.

Members of Assembly 
 1990 : Khangar Singh Choudhary (BJP)
 2003 : Khushveer Singh (INC)
 2008 onwards : Seat does not exist.

Election results

1990 Assembly Election
 Khangar Singh Choudhary (BJP) : 35,378 votes  
 Chakarvarti Singh (INC) : 27,408

2003 Assembly Election
 Khushveer Singh (INC) : 42,282 votes  
 Kesha Ram Choudhary (BJP) : 35,411

See also 
 List of constituencies of Rajasthan Legislative Assembly

References 

Former assembly constituencies of Rajasthan